Ostreichnion is a genus of fungi in the family Mytilinidiaceae.

References

External links 
Index Fungorum

Mytilinidiales
Dothideomycetes genera